Elliniko-Sourmena B.C. is a Greek basketball club, based in Elliniko, a suburb in the south of Athens. The club was founded in 2012 after merging the older local basketball clubs, Elliniko B.C. and Sourmena B.C. The colours of the club are the blue and white and the emblem is a torch. The most successful team of the club is the women team which dominated for two seasons (2013–14 and 2014–15) in women's Greek basketball and won two Greek championships and two cups.

Women's team

History
Elliniko-Sourmena B.C. was founded 2012, after merging of Elliniko B.C. and Sourmena B.C. The former club Elliniko B.C. had promoted in A1 Ethniki in the period 2011-12. The new team replaced Elliniko B.C and played in first division. In period 2012-13 finished in 2nd place, after losing by Panathinaikos in the Championship finals. But the next season reached to top, winning both the championship and the cup. The club repeated the double the next year. But the presence of women team of Elliniko- Sourmena finished in summer of 2015, when the club merged with the Olympiacos women's team and was replaced by Olympiacos in the championship.

last seasons

Notable players
 Pelagia Papamichail
 Anastasia Gkotzi
 Evdokia Stamati
 Afroditi Kosma
 Lykendra Johnson
 Nena Nikolaidou
 Anthi Balta
 Maria Roza Boni
 Vaso Fouraki
 Stella Fouraki
 Roula Kalogirou
 Aristea Maglara

Men's team
The men's team of Elliniko-Sourmena continues its presence. The club plays in the lower divisions of Greek championship. The season 2014-15, it played in B ESKANA (local division of south Athens).

Honours
Women's Team
Greek Championships (2): 2014, 2015
Greek Cups (2): 2014, 2015

References

External links
Official Page

Women's basketball teams in Greece
Basketball teams established in 2012
Basketball teams in Athens